Nathanael Anthony Ralph (born 14 February 1993) is an English footballer, who plays as a left back or winger for Southend United.

Career

Yeovil Town

On 14 August 2012, Ralph made his Yeovil debut in the Football League Cup against Colchester United in a 3–0 victory. He scored his first goal for the club in a 3–1 victory over Preston in a League One match, having come on as a substitute midway through the second half. He made 17 appearances in the 2012–13 campaign, though did not feature in the play-off final victory over Brentford which took the "Glovers" into the Championship.

Ralph was released by Yeovil at the end of the 2014–15 season following their relegation to League Two.

Newport County

On 25 June 2015 Ralph signed for League Two club Newport County. His time at Newport was beset by injuries and although he made the substitutes bench on a number of occasions he did not make a competitive appearance. On 12 February 2016 he joined Aldershot Town on loan until the end of the 2015–16 season. He was released by Newport on 10 May 2016 at the end of his contract.

Woking

On 3 August 2016, Ralph signed a one-year contract with Woking. On 6 August 2016, Ralph made his Woking debut in a 3–1 home defeat against Lincoln City, playing the full 90 minutes. Three days later, Ralph went onto score his first Woking goal in a 2–2 draw with Solihull Moors. On 15 June 2017, Ralph signed a new one-year deal for the 2017–18 campaign.

Dundee

On 31 May 2018, Ralph signed a two-year deal with Scottish Premiership side Dundee. He won the club's player of the year award for 2018/19, but they were relegated. Ralph then exercised a clause in his contract that allowed him to become a free agent.

Southend United

Southend United signed Ralph to a two-year contract, with an option for a third year, in July 2019. He scored his first goal for Southend when he scored in an EFL Trophy tie against AFC Wimbledon on 13 November 2019. He dislocated his shoulder in December.

Career statistics

Honours
Yeovil Town
Football League One play-offs: 2012–13

References

External links

Living people
People from Great Dunmow
1993 births
English footballers
Association football fullbacks
English Football League players
National League (English football) players
Arsenal F.C. players
Peterborough United F.C. players
Kettering Town F.C. players
Yeovil Town F.C. players
Newport County A.F.C. players
Aldershot Town F.C. players
Woking F.C. players
Dundee F.C. players
Association football wingers
Southend United F.C. players
Scottish Professional Football League players